The 2022–23 Women's Big Bash League season or WBBL|08 was the eighth season of the Women's Big Bash League (WBBL), the semi-professional women's Twenty20 domestic cricket competition in Australia. The tournament was played from 13 October to 26 November 2022. The Perth Scorchers entered the season as the defending champions, having won their maiden title in WBBL07, but failed to qualify for the finals.

The Sydney Sixers won eleven games during the regular season—a new WBBL record—and finished on top of the points table for the fourth time in the team's history, thereby automatically qualifying (and earning host rights) for the Final. In the championship decider, played at North Sydney Oval, the Sixers were defeated in an upset by the Adelaide Strikers. Making a second-consecutive Final appearance, the Strikers won by ten runs to claim their first WBBL title. All-rounder Deandra Dottin was pivotal in her team's victory, contributing an unbeaten 52 runs with the bat and two wickets with the ball, and was subsequently named Player of the Match.

For the third-straight season, Perth Scorchers batter Beth Mooney was the competition's leading run-scorer. Adelaide Strikers fast bowler Megan Schutt led the league for wickets taken, and Sydney Sixers all-rounder Ashleigh Gardner became the first past-winner of the Young Gun Award to be named Player of the Tournament.

Teams

Each squad is made up of 15 active players. Teams can sign up to five 'marquee players', with a maximum of three of those from overseas. Marquees are defined as any overseas player, or a local player who holds a Cricket Australia national contract at the start of the WBBL|08 signing period.

The table below lists each team's marquee players and other key details for the season.

Personnel changes

Local players 
The table below lists local player movements made ahead of the season.

Overseas players 
The table below lists changes to overseas player allocations made before and during the season.

Leadership 
Coaching changes made ahead of the season included:

 Jonathan Batty was appointed head coach of the Melbourne Stars, replacing Jarrad Loughman.
 Charlotte Edwards was appointed head coach of the Sydney Sixers, replacing Ben Sawyer.
 Dan Marsh was appointed head coach the Hobart Hurricanes, replacing Salliann Beams.

Captaincy changes made ahead of the season included:
 Elyse Villani was appointed captain of the Hobart Hurricanes, replacing Rachel Priest (5–8 win–loss record).
 Nicole Faltum was appointed captain of the Melbourne Stars, replacing Meg Lanning (27–25 win–loss record).

Captaincy changes made during the season included:
 Hayley Matthews stood in as acting captain of the Melbourne Renegades for two games, after Sophie Molineux sustained a knee injury.
 Megan Schutt stood in as acting captain of the Adelaide Strikers for two games while Tahlia McGrath was rested with a back complaint.

Media coverage 
Seven Network were once again scheduled to broadcast 24 matches on free-to-air television, which will be simulcast on Foxtel. The remaining 35 matches will be broadcast by Foxtel, and will also be streamed live on cricket.com.au. All 59 matches will be available to watch live and on-demand via Kayo Sports.

Points table

Win–loss table 
Below is a summary of results for each team's fourteen regular season matches, plus finals where applicable, in chronological order. A team's opponent for any given match is listed above the margin of victory/defeat.

Fixtures 
As per all previous seasons, WBBL|08 will consist of a 56-match double round-robin, followed by a finals series featuring the top four qualifiers.

Week 1

Week 2

Week 3

Week 4

Week 5

In the 15th meeting between the two Melbourne teams—the first to take place in their home city since 30 November 2019—the Renegades lost three early wickets before Josie Dooley and Courtney Webb formed a 50-run partnership from 39 balls. Sarah Coyte hit two sixes off the bowling of Kim Garth in the 20th over, helping to set a target of 149 for victory.

The Stars began the run chase sluggishly, and failed to capitalise on several controversial umpiring decisions in their favour. Alice Capsey survived a close stumping chance but was ultimately dismissed for just eleven, while the Decision Review System overturned an LBW call for Garth who would nevertheless fall to the bowling of Coyte in the following over. Earlier in the innings, Coyte became the eighth player in WBBL history to claim 100 career wickets.

Annabel Sutherland breathed life into the contest as the Stars scored 22 runs from the 14th over against the previously economical Ella Hayward. The Renegades created several opportunities to effectively close out the match but put down key catching chances, which included an error in the field by Shabnim Ismail off her own bowling.

Needing an unlikely 23 runs from six balls to win, Sutherland promptly launched two sixes to dramatically shift the game's momentum. While delivering the third ball of the final over, Renegades captain Sophie Molineux suffered a knee injury which forced her from the field. Georgia Prestwidge was subsequently given the task of finishing the over, having not bowled throughout the innings up to that point. Sutherland proceeded to hit another six, and Stars captain Nicole Faltum then scored one run off the last delivery of the match to clinch her team's sixth win against their crosstown rivals.

Week 6

Knockout phase

Eliminator

Challenger

Final

Background 
The Sydney Sixers reached their fifth WBBL Final, having appeared in each of the league's first four championship deciders. They became the second team in the competition's history (following the Melbourne Stars in WBBL06) to reach the Final after finishing the previous season in last place. WBBL|08 Sixers squad members Erin Burns, Lauren Cheatle, Ashleigh Gardner, Alyssa Healy and Ellyse Perry were all part of the team's title-winning campaign in WBBL03. Gardner, Healy and Perry were also part of the team's title-winning campaign in WBBL02.

The Adelaide Strikers reached their second-consecutive WBBL Final, and third in four seasons. Suzie Bates, overseas marquee player for the Sydney Sixers in WBBL|08, was the captain of the Strikers in WBBL05 when they were defeated in the championship decider by the Brisbane Heat. Jemma Barsby and Laura Wolvaardt are the only WBBL|08 Strikers squad members to have previously been part of a title-winning campaign, having played for the Heat when they defeated the Sixers in the WBBL04 Final.

The Sixers and Strikers had never previously met in a championship decider. The only prior meeting in the knockout phase occurred during WBBL|03, when the Sixers recorded a 17-run semi-final defeat of the Strikers. The WBBL|08 Final would be the 18th overall encounter between the two teams, with the Sixers holding a 12–5 head-to-head edge. It would be the second Final held at North Sydney Oval, following the WBBL|06 Final between the Melbourne Stars and Sydney Thunder, making it the first venue to host multiple championship deciders.

Although the Sydney Sixers and Adelaide Strikers had never met in a WBBL Final before, several players from both sides were involved in the 2015–16 WNCL final between New South Wales (Cheatle, Healy and Perry) and South Australia (Tahlia McGrath, Tegan McPharlin, Bridget Patterson, Megan Schutt and Amanda-Jade Wellington). The match, which South Australia won by 54 runs, was notable for marking the end of New South Wales' ten-year championship streak in the national 50-over competition.

Match summary 

Laura Wolvaardt and Katie Mack put on a 51-run first-wicket stand for the Strikers, though both players were then removed within the space of six balls. Mack (31 off 26) became just the second batter in WBBL history (following Suzie Bates in WBBL|02) to be dismissed hit wicket. Deandra Dottin survived two close calls in the ninth over off the bowling of Kate Peterson—first a catch put down by Nicole Bolton at point, then a catch taken from a waist-high no ball. The next over Dottin was caught again, but this time she was granted a reprieve due to Ellyse Perry committing a front-foot no ball.

Scoring slowed notably between the 13th and 17th overs of the innings, and the trio of McGrath, Patterson and Madeline Penna all fell in that period. The Sixers were made to pay for their earlier missed opportunities when Dottin launched a six off Gardner in the 18th over, then hit a four and another six off the last two balls of the Peterson-delivered 19th over. Having set the favourites a target of 148 for victory, general consensus among commentators was the Strikers had been restricted to a below-par total.

The run chase began after an unusual twelve-minute delay, caused by a complaint from Sixers batter Suzie Bates about the setting sun impairing her vision. The Strikers quickly claimed ascendancy in the contest, as the hosts found themselves down 4/16 in the sixth over. Perry (33 off 32) and Nicole Bolton (32 off 27) helped their team recover via a 60-run partnership, though each batter would be bowled by McGrath and Darcie Brown in the 14th and 15th over respectively.

Sophie Ecclestone and Maitlan Brown combined to clear the rope four times late in the innings, while the Strikers made several errors in the field which kept the door ajar. Nevertheless, wickets continued to fall, and the task became too much for the Sixers after Ecclestone was deceived by a Megan Schutt slower ball. Facing Amanda-Jade Wellington's leg spin, Maitlan Brown hit the last delivery of the match in the air to long-on, which Wolvaardt successfully juggled and consequently sealed a ten-run victory for the Strikers.

Post-match 
Barbadian marquee Deandra Dottin became the third-consecutive overseas signing to be named Player of the Match in a WBBL Final. The Strikers became the fifth team to win a WBBL title, leaving the Hobart Hurricanes, Melbourne Renegades and Melbourne Stars as the three remaining teams yet to claim a championship. Wicket-keeper Tegan McPharlin retired from cricket at the conclusion of the match, having played 109 WBBL matches for the Strikers and 86 WNCL matches for South Australia.

Statistics

Highest totals

Most runs

Most wickets

Awards

Player of the tournament 
Player of the Tournament votes are awarded on a 3-2-1 basis by the two standing umpires at the conclusion of every match, meaning a player can receive a maximum of six votes per game.

Source:

Team of the tournament 
The selection panel for the Team of the Tournament was made up of the head coaches of the eight WBBL clubs.

  Beth Mooney (Perth Scorchers)
  Georgia Redmayne (Brisbane Heat) – wicket-keeper
  Alyssa Healy (Sydney Sixers)
  Ashleigh Gardner (Sydney Sixers)
  Annabel Sutherland (Melbourne Stars)
  Erin Burns (Sydney Sixers)
  Amelia Kerr (Brisbane Heat)
  Jess Jonassen (Brisbane Heat) – captain
  Amanda-Jade Wellington (Adelaide Strikers)
  Nicola Hancock (Brisbane Heat)
  Megan Schutt (Adelaide Strikers)
  Molly Strano (Hobart Hurricanes) – 12th

Source:

Young gun award
Players under 21 years of age at the start of the season were eligible for the Young Gun Award. The winner was chosen by national selector Shawn Flegler.

Melbourne Stars all-rounder Tess Flintoff was named the Young Gun for WBBL|08, having scored 116 runs at an average of 23.20 and a strike rate of 165.71, and claimed four wickets during the season.

"Player of the match" tally
The table below shows the number of Player of the Match awards won by each player throughout the season. The career tally indicates the number of awards won by a player throughout her entire time in the league at the conclusion of the season, including awards won while previously playing for a different WBBL team.

See also
 2022–23 Big Bash League season

Notes

References

Further reading

External links
 Official fixtures
 Series home at ESPN Cricinfo

 
2022–23 Women's Big Bash League season by team
Women's Big Bash League seasons
!
Women's Big Bash League